Jane Wong is an American poet and professor at Western Washington University.  She is the author of Overpour and has been published in Best American Poetry 2015 and Best New Poets 2012.  Wong grew up in Tinton Falls, New Jersey, where her parents owned a Chinese restaurant, and where Jane remembers much of her childhood.  She currently resides in Seattle, Washington.

Background 
Wong received her B.A. in English from Bard College, her MFA in Poetry from the Iowa Writers' Workshop, and her Ph.D. in English from the University of Washington.

Awards and honors 
2016 Stanley Kunitz Memorial Prize from The American Poetry Review
2015 Best American Poetry
2012 Best New Poets
Bread Loaf Writers' Conference Fellowship
Kundiman Fellowship
2007-2008 Fulbright Scholarship

In 2016, Wong was featured among ten artists to mark the year to come, together with painter Ari Glass, dancer David Rue, and others.

Works 
Kudzu does not stop, United States : Organic Weapon Arts, 2012. , 
Overpour, Notre Dame, Indiana : Action Books, 2016. ,

References 

Living people
American women writers
American poets of Asian descent
Bard College alumni
Iowa Writers' Workshop alumni
People from Seattle
People from Tinton Falls, New Jersey
University of Washington alumni
Year of birth missing (living people)
21st-century American women